An adrenal tumor or adrenal mass is any benign or malignant neoplasms of the adrenal gland, several of which are notable for their tendency to overproduce endocrine hormones. Adrenal cancer is the presence of malignant adrenal tumors, and includes neuroblastoma, adrenocortical carcinoma and some adrenal pheochromocytomas. Most adrenal pheochromocytomas and all adrenocortical adenomas are benign tumors, which do not metastasize or invade nearby tissues, but may cause significant health problems by unbalancing hormones.

Metastasis to the adrenals

Metastasis to one or both adrenal glands is the most common form of malignant adrenal lesion, and the second most common adrenal tumor after benign adenomas. Primary tumors in such cases are most commonly from lung cancer  (39%), breast cancer (35%), malignant melanoma, gastrointestinal tract cancer, pancreas cancer, and renal cancer.

Tumors of the adrenal cortex
The adrenal cortex is composed of three distinct layers of endocrine cells which produce critical steroid hormones. These include the glucocorticoids which are critical for regulation of blood sugar and the immune system, as well as response to physiological stress, the mineralcorticoid aldosterone, which regulates blood pressure and kidney function, and certain sex hormones. Both benign and malignant tumors of the adrenal cortex may produce steroid hormones, with important clinical consequences.

Adrenocortical adenoma

Adrenocortical adenomas are benign tumors of the adrenal cortex which are extremely common (present in 1-10% of persons at autopsy). They should not be confused with adrenocortical "nodules", which are not true neoplasms. Adrenocortical adenomas are uncommon in patients younger than 30 years old, and have equal incidence in both sexes.
The clinical significance of these neoplasms is twofold. First, they have been detected as incidental findings with increasing frequency in recent years, due to the increasing use of CT scans and magnetic resonance imaging in a variety of medical settings. This can result in expensive additional testing and invasive procedures to rule out the slight possibility of an early adrenocortical carcinoma. Second, a minority (about 15%) of adrenocortical adenomas are "functional", meaning that they produce glucocorticoids, mineralcorticoids, and/or sex steroids, resulting in endocrine disorders such as Cushing's syndrome, Conn's syndrome (hyperaldosteronism), virilization of females, or feminization of males. Functional adrenocortical adenomas are surgically curable.

Most of the adrenocortical adenomas are less than 2 cm in greatest dimension and less than 50 gram in weight. However, size and weight of the adrenal cortical tumors are no longer considered to be a reliable sign of benignity or malignancy. Grossly, adrenocortical adenomas are encapsulated, well-circumscribed, solitary tumors with solid, homogeneous yellow-cut surface. Necrosis and hemorrhage are rare findings.

Adrenocortical carcinoma

Adrenocortical carcinoma (ACC) is a rare, highly aggressive cancer of adrenal cortical cells, which may occur in children or adults. ACCs may be "functional", producing steroid hormones and consequent endocrine dysfunction similar to that seen in many adrenocortical adenomas, but many are not. Due to their location deep in the retroperitoneum, most adrenocortical carcinomas are not diagnosed until they have grown quite large. They frequently invade large vessels, such as the renal vein and inferior vena cava, as well as metastasizing via the lymphatics and through the blood to the lungs and other organs. The most effective treatment is surgery, although this is not feasible for many patients, and the overall prognosis of the disease is poor. Chemotherapy, radiation therapy, and hormonal therapy may also be employed in the treatment of this disease.

Tumors of the adrenal medulla
The adrenal medulla is located anatomically at the center of each adrenal gland, and is composed of neuroendocrine (chromaffin) cells which produce and release epinephrine (adrenaline) into the bloodstream in response to activation of the sympathetic nervous system. Neuroblastoma and pheochromocytoma are the two most important tumors which arise from the adrenal medulla. Both tumors may also arise from extra-adrenal sites, specifically, in the paraganglia of the sympathetic chain.

Neuroblastoma

Neuroblastoma is an aggressive cancer of immature neuroblastic cells (precursors of neurons), and is one of the most common pediatric cancers, with a median age at diagnosis of two years. Adrenal neuroblastoma typically presents with a rapidly enlarging abdominal mass. Although the tumor has often spread to distant parts of the body at the time of diagnosis, this cancer is unusual in that many cases are highly curable when the spread is limited to the liver, skin, and/or bone marrow (stage IVS). Related, but less aggressive tumors composed of more mature neural cells include ganglioneuroblastoma and ganglioneuroma. Neuroblastic tumors often produce elevated levels of catecholamine hormone metabolites, such as vanillylmandelic acid (VMA) and homovanillic acid, and may produce severe watery diarrhea through production of vasoactive intestinal peptide. Treatment of neuroblastoma includes surgery and radiation therapy for localized disease, and chemotherapy for metastatic disease.

Pheochromocytoma

Pheochromocytoma is a neoplasm composed of cells similar to the chromaffin cells of the mature adrenal medulla. Pheochromocytomas occur in patients of all ages, and may be sporadic, or associated with a hereditary cancer syndrome, such as multiple endocrine neoplasia (MEN) types IIA and IIB, neurofibromatosis type I, or von Hippel–Lindau syndrome. Only 10% of adrenal pheochromocytomas are malignant, while the rest are benign tumors. The most clinically important feature of pheochromocytomas is their tendency to produce large amounts of the catecholamine hormones epinephrine (adrenaline) and norepinephrine. This may lead to potentially life-threatening high blood pressure, or cardiac arrhythmias, and numerous symptoms such as headache, palpitations, anxiety attacks, sweating, weight loss, and tremor. Diagnosis is most easily confirmed through urinary measurement of catecholamine metabolites such as VMA and metanephrines. Most pheochromocytomas are initially treated with anti-adrenergic drugs to protect against catecholamine overload, with surgery employed to remove the tumor once the patient is medically stable.

Incidentalomas
An adrenal incidentaloma is an adrenal tumor found by coincidence without clinical symptoms or suspicion. It is one of the more common unexpected findings revealed by computed tomography (CT), magnetic resonance imaging (MRI), or ultrasonography.

In these cases, a dexamethasone suppression test is often used to detect cortisol excess, and metanephrines or catecholamines for excess of these hormones. Tumors under 3 cm are generally considered benign and are only treated if there are grounds for a diagnosis of Cushing's syndrome or pheochromocytoma. Radiodensity gives a clue in estimating malignancy risk, wherein a tumor with 10 Hounsfield units or less on an unenhanced CT is probably a lipid-rich adenoma.
Hormonal evaluation includes:
 1-mg overnight dexamethasone suppression test
 24-hour urinary specimen for measurement of fractionated metanephrines and catecholamines
 Blood plasma aldosterone concentration and plasma renin activity, if hypertension is present
On CT scan, benign adenomas typically are of low radiographic density (due to fat content) and show rapid washout of contrast medium (50% or more of the contrast medium washes out at 10 minutes). If the hormonal evaluation is negative and imaging suggests benign, followup should be considered with imaging at 6, 12, and 24 months and repeat hormonal evaluation yearly for 4 years

Future diagnostic tools 
Blood circulating microRNAs (miRNA) has been investigated in the recent years for the potential as a less-invasive biomarker for adrenal diseases. Nine studies have so far investigated the occurrence of circulating miRNAs in blood from patients diagnosed with adrenocortical tumors. MiRNAs can be released into the blood stream by three different types of excretion. Cellular damage with passive release (necrosis, inflammation), active secretion in the form of extracellular vesicles (EV) (microvesicles, exosomes and apoptotic bodies) or in association with high density lipoproteins (HDL) and Argonaute (AGO) proteins. The majority of miRNAs found in blood are in complexes with AGO. Despite the promising results, the sensitivity of potential circulating miRNA markers for adrenocortical tumors appears to be variable. An increase in sensitivity could possibly be achieved by targeting only EV-associated miRNAs as the release of miRNAs into EVs are hypothesized to be a controlled process. EV-associated miRNAs could thereby act as more specific markers of malignancy. However, as there were significant differences in the results of the studies performed, methodological differences and low patient numbers could contribute to this discrepancy. This calls for further studies on larger cohorts with uniform methodological requirements to clarify the applicability of circulating miRNAs as biomarkers of prognosis and malignancy in patients diagnosed with adrenocortical tumors.

References

Further reading

External links 

Endocrine neoplasia
Adrenal gland disorders